Wild Cat Township is a township in Elk County, Kansas, USA.  As of the 2000 census, its population was 637.

Geography
Elk Falls Township contains the incorporated settlement of Moline.

References
 USGS Geographic Names Information System (GNIS)

External links
 US-Counties.com
 City-Data.com

Townships in Elk County, Kansas
Townships in Kansas